Man in the Middle is a 1964 British-American CinemaScope war film and starring Robert Mitchum and directed by Guy Hamilton. The movie, set in World War II India, tells the story of the murder trial of an American Army officer who killed a British soldier. Mitchum plays Lieut. Col. Barney Adams, who has been assigned as the accused man's defence counsel. The film is also known as The Winston Affair, the title of the novel the film was based on, which was written by Howard Fast.

Plot
Friction develops between American and British troops stationed in India during World War II and fights break out between the troops when, in 1944, American 2nd Lieutenant Winston (Keenan Wynn) shoots unarmed British Staff Sergeant Quinn (Bill Mitchell) several times, seemingly without provocation, in front of 11 witnesses. American General Kempton (Barry Sullivan) assigns Lieutenant Colonel Barney Adams (Robert Mitchum) to defend Winston at his court-martial because, even though everyone thinks it is an open-and-shut case, the general wants Adams to put up a vigorous defence. He is to make it clear that the verdict is not simply a sop to reduce tensions between the two armies before an offensive against the real enemy. Adams later finds out that Winston's brother-in-law, a Congressman, has been applying pressure.

The Army Lunacy Commission has found Winston fit and sane; Adams is informed by nurse Kate Davray (France Nuyen) that Colonel Burton (Alexander Knox), who headed the Commission, refused to accept the report (which he destroyed) of the hospital's psychiatric head, Major Kaufman (Sam Wanamaker), who believes Winston is a psychopath. Burton is anxious to have Winston convicted and hanged to patch the strained relations between the two forces. Adams instructs Kaufman to bring his report to the trial, but when Burton is informed of this order, he transfers Kaufman to a distant hospital. Adams visits British Major Kensington (Trevor Howard), a qualified psychiatrist who also considers Winston to be psychopathic but has been warned not to interfere. Kensington believes Winston killed Quinn out of a feeling of victimisation because Quinn, a sergeant, had the same duties as Winston, a lieutenant. During a brief love affair, nurse Kate Davray gives Colonel Adams an unsigned carbon copy of Major Kaufman's report, which at first, he refuses to accept.

Winston, in an interview with Adams, raves that he killed Quinn for defiling the white race by consorting with a black woman. Though he despises Winston, Adams refuses to rig the trial and he holds back his defence, waiting for Kaufman to arrive as a witness. When he learns that Kaufman has been killed in a jeep accident on the way to the trial, Adams calls Kensington to the stand, after establishing that no member of the lunacy commission is a qualified psychiatrist, to authenticate the unsigned photocopy of Major Kaufman's report. As Kensington describes Winston's mental illness to the court, Winston cracks and begins raving. Adams wins his case and spends a few days of peace and happiness with nurse Davray before leaving the area. The friction between the troops is eased and they prepare to enter battle in complete unity.

Cast

 Robert Mitchum as Lieutenant Colonel Barney Adams  
 France Nuyen as Kate Davray  
 Barry Sullivan as General Kempton  
 Trevor Howard as Major Kensington  
 Keenan Wynn as Lieutenant Winston  
 Sam Wanamaker as Major Kaufman  
 Alexander Knox as Colonel Burton  
 Gary Cockrell as Lieutenant Morse  
 Robert Nichols as Lieutenant Bender  
 Michael Goodliffe as Colonel Shaw  
 Errol John as Sergeant Jackson  
 Paul Maxwell as Major Smith  
 Lionel Murton as Captain Gunther  
 Russell Napier as Colonel Thompson  
 Jared Allen as Captain Dwyer
 David Bauer as Colonel Mayburt 
 Edward Underdown as Major Wyclif 
 Howard Marion-Crawford as Major Poole
 Al Waxman as Corporal Zimmerman
 Terence Cooper as Major Clement
 Basdeo Panday as the Indian Correspondent

Reception
According to Fox records the film cost $2,800,000 to produce but only earned $1,735,000 in film rentals.

References

External links
 
 
 
 
 
 
 New York Times review by Bosley Crowther, 5 March 1964

1963 films
1963 drama films
CinemaScope films
British war drama films
British black-and-white films
Military courtroom films
Films based on American novels
Films set in India
Films directed by Guy Hamilton
Films scored by John Barry (composer)
Films shot at Associated British Studios
20th Century Fox films
British World War II films
1960s English-language films
1960s British films